Karine Trudel is a Canadian politician who was elected as a Member of Parliament in the House of Commons of Canada to represent the federal riding of Jonquière during the 2015 Canadian federal election and served until her defeat in the 2019 Canadian federal election.

Early life and education 
Raised as a catholic, Trudel was baptized in the Catholic Church of Montreal Sainte-Thérèse-de-L'enfant-Jésus.

Prior to her political career, Trudel was a regional president for the Canadian Union of Postal Workers in Saguenay−Lac-Saint-Jean from 2007 to 2015. Speaking about her time as president, Trudel "loved [her] eight years as President." Trudel also worked as a letter carrier for Canada Post.

Political career 
Ms. Trudel cites Peter MacKay as her inspiration for running for federal politics. In a 2016 interview, Trudel spoke about hearing MacKay comment in 2014 "that the reason women were underrepresented on the Supreme Court was that they felt guilty about leaving the house because they had children to raise." With many years experience in balancing work and childcare responsibilities, Trudel was encouraged to run for government by Dany Morin, after she spoke to him about being infuriated by MacKay's comments.

Personal life 
Trudel is an ambassador for Arvida, created by the Committee for the Heritage Designation of Arvida (CORPA), which focuses on preserving the heritage of the city.

Trudel has two children.

Electoral record

References

Year of birth missing (living people)
Living people
Canadian trade unionists
Women members of the House of Commons of Canada
Mail carriers
Members of the House of Commons of Canada from Quebec
New Democratic Party MPs
Politicians from Saguenay, Quebec
Women in Quebec politics
21st-century Canadian politicians
21st-century Canadian women politicians